Cornelia Pammer (born 9 July 2000) is an Austrian swimmer. She competed in the women's 50 metre breaststroke event at the 2018 FINA World Swimming Championships (25 m), in Hangzhou, China.

References

External links
 

2000 births
Living people
Austrian female breaststroke swimmers
Place of birth missing (living people)